Innova Capital Partners ("Innova") is a US-based private investment firm with a strategy predicated on identifying disruptive innovations. 

Innova invests in projects and companies at various stages, identifying or developing its own talented teams in promising sectors and working strategically to help them grow.

History 
Innova began with investments in developing innovative LED lighting conversion and renewable energy projects. The firm quickly turned its focus to South America. In April 2016 Goldman Sachs announced a joint venture with Innova to develop telecommunication assets in Colombia. The alliance financed the Colombian company Golden Comunicaciones, which designs and develops mobile infrastructure, specifically the construction of cell phone towers.

In September 2017, Innova announced its partnership with Ciel & Terre (C&T) to develop floating solar projects in Colombia. Innova will operate as a developer and investor while C&T will provide the photovoltaic technology. Since that time Innova has gone on to invest its own capital as well as partnering with many others to invest in innovative projects worldwide.

Over the years, Innova also expanded its presence in North America where it has made a series of investments into companies like Innova Enterprise Efficiency, which focuses on reducing energy budgets for clients in both the private and public sectors. Innova also has made investments at every stage of development from venture to operational companies, in a variety of sectors, and taking varied positions in the capital stack from debt provision, convertible notes, to direct equity investments.

External links

References

Investment companies based in New York City
Investment management companies of the United States